Aspistomella heteroptera is a species of ulidiid or picture-winged fly in the genus Aspistomella of the family Ulidiidae.

References

Ulidiidae
Insects described in 1909